Shafique Ahmed (born 16 July 1937) is a Bangladesh Awami League politician. He served as the Minister for Law, Justice and Parliamentary Affairs of the Government of Bangladesh.

Education
Ahmed earned his bachelor's and master's in geography from the University of Dhaka in 1958 and 1959 respectively. He earned his LLB degree from the same university in 1963. He earned his LLM degree from King's College London in 1967. He received his Bar-at-law from Lincoln's Inn in 1967.

Career
Ahmed served as a faculty member at the University of Dhaka from 1969 to 1973.

Personal life
Ahmed is married to academic and activist Mahfuza Khanam.

References

1937 births
Living people
People from Comilla District
University of Dhaka alumni
Alumni of King's College London
Academic staff of the University of Dhaka
Awami League politicians
Law, Justice and Parliamentary Affairs ministers of Bangladesh